Hibbertia araneolifera is a species of flowering plant in the family Dilleniaceae and is endemic to Queensland. It is a small shrub with wiry branches, narrow elliptic to lance-shaped leaves and yellow flowers arranged singly in leaf axils, with forty to forty-four stamens arranged around the three carpels.

Description
Flowering occurs from May to September.

Taxonomy
Hibbertia araneolifera was first formally described in 2010 by Hellmut R. Toelken in the Journal of the Adelaide Botanic Gardens from specimens collected by Stanley Thatcher Blake near Isabella Falls in 1970. The specific epithet (araneolifera) means "spider-small-bearing", referring to the hairs on the leaves that resemble spiders carrying hundreds of young on their backs.

Distribution and habitat
This hibbertia grows on stony ridges in forest in northern Queensland.

Conservation status
Hibbertia araneolifera is classified as of "least concern" under the Queensland Government Nature Conservation Act 1992.

See also
List of Hibbertia species

References

araneolifera
Flora of Queensland
Plants described in 2010
Taxa named by Hellmut R. Toelken